Yar Mohammad Khan (September 9, 1920 – August 29, 1981) was one of the founders and the first treasurer of the Bangladesh Awami League, the main political party that eventually led Bangladesh's struggle for independence against the West Pakistan regime.   

Khan’s residence at 18, Karkun Bari Lane, Dhaka, was the League’s party office for its first few years. As treasurer, he donated a Jeep and a newspaper, The Daily Ittefaq, to the party. His able financing helped mobilize and galvanize the Awami League in its initial stages, bolstered its strength, and helped catapult it into the leading party in Bangladesh’s independence movement.

The Unfinished Memoirs

Sheikh Mujibur Rahman expressed his views about a prominent leader like Yar Mohammad Khan in his autobiography The Unfinished Memoirs.
Yar Mohammad Khan was one of the key founders of the Awami Muslim League in 1949. Presenting to you as a historical masterpiece in the words of Sheikh Shaheb in his biograpbiography The Unfinished Memoirs. The following scripts are written by Bangabandhu Sheikh Mujibur Rahman.

Political career

Formation of Awami Muslim League

In 1949, Moulana Bhasani discussed the possibility of forming a new political party with disaffected elements of the East Pakistan Muslim League. A committee, headed by Bhashani, as president, and Yar Mohammad Khan, as secretary, was established to organize a June 23 conference, at which the resolution creating the Awami Muslim League was adopted.

Awami League's First Party Office in Dhaka

Mogultuli
150, Mogultuli, Dhaka was a famous party place for Muslim League. In January 1948 Shamsul Haque and Sheikh Mujibur Rahman wanted to establish a newly organized Muslim League and therefore they created a workers camp at 150 Mogultuli. In February 1948, Professor Ibrahim Khan resigned from south Tangail and Maulana Bhashani won that seat in by election. Instead Maulana Bhashani was banned for election till 1950. A new date for by election was declared for South Tangail. Pakistan Muslim League nominated Khurram Khan Ponni of Korotia, while Shamsul Haque was nominated from East Pakistan. Shamsul Haque got huge support from Yar Mohammad Khan, Shawkat Ali, Aziz Ahmed and others and won the by election on 26 February 1949. Chief Minister Nurul Aminpostponed the election and a case was filed against Shamsul Haque.
South Tangail seat remained vacant. When Maulana Bhashani was released from Jail he came to Mogultuli and declared that the conspiracy of west Pakistan hast to stop. A committee was formed where Bhashani was the President and Yar Mohammad Khan became the Secretary.

Rose Garden
Being afraid of Bhashani's activity against west Pakistan many people turned their back. But during such a time Kazi Humayun Bashir declared that Maulana Bhashani along with Yar Mohammad Khan can organize the meeting at his house Rose Garden located at K.M Das Lane, Dhaka. The meeting began on 23 June 1949 and at least 300 people attended that meeting. Finally a new party was formed named as Awami Muslim League opposing Muslim League. The organizers declared that they do not want to be a part of Muslim league anymore as they remain neglected. They formed Awami Muslim League so that they can say something against Muslim League's negligence. Sheikh Mujibur Rahman was in prison, so he couldn't attend that meeting. The committee declared Maulana Bhashani as president, Ataur Rahman Khan as vice president, Shamsul Haque as General Secretary, Sheikh Mujibur Rahman as Joint Secretary and Yar Mohammad Khan as a treasurer of the Awami Muslim League.

Karkun Bari Lane
The three storied house of Yar Mohammad Khan located at 18, Karkun Bari Lane in Dhaka became the first Party office of Awami Muslim League, which later become Awami League. Begum Jahanara Khan wife of Yar Mohammad Khan during those days used to cook lunch and dinner for the Awami League party workers.
Before cooking, Begum Jahanara Khan used to ask everyday to Sheikh Mujibur Rahman about the number of workers available for lunch and dinner and Sheikh Mujibur Rahman replied today 14 workers for lunch and 18 workers for dinner. Begum Jahanara Khan at Karkun Bari Lane entertained the Awami League party workers during that time made enough contribution to bond the party workers further like a family.     
On June 24, 1949 Awami Muslim League held up a public meeting at Armanitola Maidan,

Organized the public meeting of Awami Muslim League at Armanitola, Dhaka

Assisting Sheikh Mujibur Rahman in organizing Awami League

The picture depicts, after being released from Dhaka Central jail, Sheikh Mujibur Rahman accompanied by his father Sheikh Lutfar Rahman, Shamsul Huq, Yar Mohammad Khan and others on the way to attend the Awami League worker’s meeting (June 26, 1949).

United Front

Member of East Bengal Legislative Assembly
Yar Mohammad Khan was elected MLA on a United Front coalition ticket in 1954, the United Front being an alliance of parties of which the Awami League was the most important part. 'United Front' consisted mainly of four parties of East Bengal, namely Awami League, Krishak Sramik Party, Nizam-e-Islam Party and Ganatantri Dal.

Accompanied Sheikh Fazilatunnesa Mujib To The Prison Gate

Kagmari Conference
Yar Mohammad Khan was the treasurer of the Kagmari Conference committee which was the first national conference of the Awami League held on 6–10 February 1957. During the Kagmari conference, Maulana Bhashani said "goodbye" ("Assalamu Alaikum") to the West Pakistani authority. Mirza Ahmad Ispahani  was a close companion of Yar Mohammad Khan flew by helicopter and assisted him by providing necessary funds and attended the historic Kagmari Conference.

Social life
The picture depicts, in 1972 Yar Mohammad Khan is sitting beside Mirza Ahmad Ispahani and Bangabandhu Sheikh eeMujbur Rahman in a wedding program of Zahirul Islam, who is the younger brother of Yar Mohammad Khan and a founder chairman of ZSRM Steel Mills Ltd. Yar Mohammad Khan being the president of Dhaka City Awami League finally resigned on 12 July 1957 and quit politics forever due to some unavoidable circumstances. After that the chairman of Ispahani Group Mirza Ahmad Ispahani requested him and he started working and joined M. M. Ispahani Limited as a Director.

No matter what, but these great political leaders Abdul Hamid Khan Bhashani, Mirza Ahmad Ispahani, Yar Mohammad Khan and Sheikh Mujibur Rahman were friends forever. And they truly respect each other and this made them legends. Even after quitting politics Yar Mohammad Khan invited Sheikh Mujibur Rahman and Maulana Bhashani in his family programs.

The Daily Ittefaq
Yar Mohammad Khan was also the founder and publisher of The Daily Ittefaq. Yar Mohammad Khan financed publishing the 'Weekly Ittefaq' from the Paramount Press at 9 Hatkhola Road, Dhaka and at the beginning Mr Faizur Rahman who lived in 50, Nawabpur Road was the editor. The Ittefaq was first published as a weekly paper on December 24, 1949 by Yar Mohammad Khan who was its founder publisher. The media plays a significant role and can have a strong impact on political outcomes and Yar Mohammad Khan was aware of that. As Yar Mohammad Khan was actively involved into politics of anti-Pakistan movement, he called and appointed Tofazzal Hossain as its editor, who was working in Kolkata at the time as a journalist for The Daily Ittehad. Since 15 August 1951 Ittefaq resumed its publication and it played a significant role in the 1954 general elections, and it contributed to the victory of the United Front. Ittefaq then kept opposing all military rule of Pakistan starting from Ayub Khan to Yahya Khan. Eventually during this time, Ittefaq went from being a weekly to becoming a daily newspaper. Yar Mohammad Khan was the publisher so he declared that Ittefaq will be officially Bangladesh Awami League party's paper. He did this through a power of attorney and at that time since Moulana Bhashani was the president therefore his name was published as a founder of The Daily Ittefaq. In 1958 Tofazzal Hossain changed the name of the original founder and publisher and replaced it with his name. The newspaper incorrectly displays Tofazzal Hossain as its founder.

Assassination of Sheikh Mujibur Rahman
On 15 August 1975, a group of junior army officers invaded the presidential residence with tanks and killed Mujib, his family and personal staff. Only his daughters Sheikh Hasina Wajed and Sheikh Rehana, who were visiting West Germany, survived. When Yar Mohammad Khan heard the news of Bangabandhu's death over radio he collapsed from his chair to the floor. He suffered a minor cardiac arrest. Family members took him to a hospital and when he returned to his sense he said to put ice on his head. He couldn't accept the fact of the assassination of Sheikh Mujibur Rahman. Yar Mohammad loved Bangabandhu Sheikh Mujibur Rahman so much that he did everything to stand beside him.

Acknowledgment of Achievement
June 12, 1970, Abdul Hamid Khan Bhashani, Yar Mohammad Khan and Sheikh Mujibur Rahman gathered at a wedding program of Yar Mohammad Khan's eldest daughter Shamim Akhtar Khan.
Yar Mohammad Khan was a giver and not a taker. Yar Mohammad Khan played a bigger role in establishing Bangladesh Awami League in the Dhaka city and being the owner by publishing Ittefaq which played a vital role during the liberation period. The Awami League's first office was on the ground floor of Yar Mohammed Khan's three-storey house on 18, Karkunbari Lane. Many of the present generation do not know the name of the Awami League's founder and its innumerable leaders and workers. However, Sheikh Mujibur Rahman acknowledged the contribution of Yar Mohammad Khan in his autobiography The Unfinished Memoirs.

Death
Khan died from cardiac arrest on August 29, 1981, at CMC Hospital Vellore, Tamil Nadu, India. Survivors included his wife, two sons, five daughters, a host of relatives, and admirers.

See also
Bangladesh Awami League
Sheikh Mujibur Rahman
The Unfinished Memoirs
Abdul Hamid Khan Bhashani
The Daily Ittefaq
Mirza Ahmad Ispahani
Ashab Uddin Ahmad

References

Awami League politicians
1920 births
1981 deaths
Politicians from Dhaka
People from Dhaka
20th-century Bengalis
20th-century Muslims
Bangladeshi politicians